HMS C3 was one of 38 C-class submarines built for the Royal Navy in the first decade of the 20th century. The boat was used to demolish a viaduct during the Zeebrugge Raid in 1918.

Design and description
The C class was essentially a repeat of the preceding B class, albeit with better performance underwater. They displaced  on the surface and  submerged. The C-class submarines had a crew of two officers and fourteen ratings.

For surface running, the boats were powered by a single 16-cylinder  Vickers petrol engine that drove one propeller shaft. When submerged the propeller was driven by a  electric motor. They could reach  on the surface and  underwater.

The boats were armed with two 18-inch (45 cm) torpedo tubes in the bow. They could carry a pair of reload torpedoes, but generally did not as they would have to remove an equal weight of fuel in compensation.

Construction and career
C3 was built by Vickers at their Barrow-in-Furness shipyard, laid down on 25 November 1905 and was commissioned on 23 February 1906. The obsolete C3 was packed full of explosives for her last mission, which was to destroy a viaduct connecting the mole to the shore during the Zeebrugge Raid on 23 April 1918. Her commanding officer, Richard Douglas Sandford, received the Victoria Cross for the successful action.

Notes

References

External links 
 MaritimeQuest HMS C-3 Pages

 

British C-class submarines
Ships built in Barrow-in-Furness
World War I shipwrecks in the North Sea
Royal Navy ship names
Maritime incidents in 1918
1906 ships